Mudgegonga is a locality in northeast Victoria, Australia.

Mudgegonga is 15 minutes from the nearest town Myrtleford; there are mainly farms situated in the area. The locality was affected by the Black Saturday bushfires, with two deaths in the region.

References

Towns in Victoria (Australia)
Alpine Shire
Shire of Indigo